Baranica  (Baranytsia) is a village in the administrative district of Gmina Gorzków, within Krasnystaw County, Lublin Voivodeship, in eastern Poland.

References

Baranica